The Scottish Football Writers' Association Young Player of the Year (often called the SFWA Young Player of the Year, or simply the Scottish Young Player of the Year) award is given to the footballer in the Scottish football league system, who is seen to have been the best young (under 23) player of the previous season. The shortlist is compiled by the members of the Scottish Football Writers' Association (the SFWA), who also vote for the winner.

List of winners

As of 2022, the award has been made 21 times and has been won by 18 different players. Kieran Tierney (3) and Steven Fletcher (2) are the only players to have won the award more than once. The award was first made in 2002, and was won by Motherwell forward James McFadden. As of 2019, the award had been restricted to players who are eligible for selection by the Scotland national under-21 football team.

Breakdown of winners

Winners by club

See also
SFWA Footballer of the Year
SFWA International Player of the Year
SFWA Manager of the Year
PFA Scotland Players' Player of the Year
PFA Scotland Young Player of the Year
PFA Scotland Team of the Year
Scottish Premier League Yearly Awards

References

Scottish football trophies and awards
Awards established in 2001